161989 Cacus is a stony asteroid, classified as near-Earth object and a potentially hazardous asteroid of the Apollo group, approximately 1 kilometer in diameter. It was discovered on 8 February 1978, by German astronomer Hans-Emil Schuster at ESO's La Silla Observatory in northern Chile. Its orbit is confined between Venus and Mars.

This minor planet was named from Roman mythology, after Cacus, a fire-breathing monster, which was killed by Hercules. The official naming citation was published by the Minor Planet Center on 24 November 2007.

References

External links 
 Lightcurve Database Query (LCDB), at www.minorplanet.info
 Dictionary of Minor Planet Names, Google books
 Asteroids and comets rotation curves, CdR – Geneva Observatory, Raoul Behrend
 
 
 

161989
Discoveries by Hans-Emil Schuster
Named minor planets
161989
161989
19780208